Altküla is a village in Toila Parish, Ida-Viru County in northeastern Estonia.

Altküla was first mentioned in 1426 as Kärilõpe.

References

Villages in Ida-Viru County